The Crowning of the Bard is one of the most important events in an eisteddfod.  The most famous such ceremony takes place at the National Eisteddfod of Wales, and is normally on the Monday afternoon of Eisteddfod week (it was formerly held on the Tuesday).

A new bardic crown is specially designed and made for each eisteddfod and is awarded to the winning entrant in the competition for the Pryddest, poetry written in free verse. There are three judges and these have included past crowned bards, such as Mererid Hopwood and T. James Jones.

The National Eisteddfod crown was first awarded in 1867. The crowning ceremony is presided over by the Archdruid, who invites one of the judges to read the adjudication and judges' comments before announcing the identity of the bard, using only the pen name that the winner has used when submitting the work.  Up to this point, no one knows the true identity of the bard, who is asked to stand and is then escorted to the stage and crowned.

Winning the "double" of bardic chair and crown at the same Eisteddfod is a feat that has only been achieved a handful of times in the history of the Eisteddfod.  Alan Llwyd and Donald Evans have won the double twice.

In August 2018 the winner of the crown was awarded to Cardiff author, Catrin Dafydd, though during the ceremony the archdruid, Geraint Llifon, caused controversy by saying she couldn't have achieved this without men. Llifon later apologised.

List of the crown winners

See also
 Chairing of the Bard

References

Eisteddfod
Welsh-language literature
Welsh poetry